Klesse is a surname. Notable people with the surname include:

 Bill Klesse, Chairman and CEO of Valero Energy Corporation 
 William R. Klesse (born 1947), American businessman